PP-67 Mandi Bahauddin-III is a Constituency of Provincial Assembly of Punjab.

General elections 2013

General elections 2008
 Punjab, Pakistan
In this election Chaudhry Farooq Ahmad Gujjar from PML-Q won the seat by scoring 80,789 votes, whereas Liaqat Ali Ranjha was runner-up, successfully gaining 19,060 votes as independent candidate. Liaqat Ali Ranjha had contested election as independent candidate due to lead boycott of elections by PTI.

General Election 2002
 Punjab, Pakistan
In this election Chaudhry Farooq Ahmed Gujjar S/O Chaudhry Fazal Hussain Gujjar from PML-Q won the seat by scoring 26,207 votes, whereas Nazar Muhammad Gondal was runner-up, successfully gaining 9800 votes as independent candidate. Nazar Gondal had contested election as PPP Candidate.

See also
 PP-66 Mandi Bahauddin-II
 PP-68 Mandi Bahauddin-IV

References

External links

 Election commission Pakistan's official website
 Awazoday.com check result
 Official Website of Government of Punjab

Provincial constituencies of Punjab, Pakistan